The) is a building in Vitoria-Gasteiz, Basque Country, Spain. It was declared Bien de Interés Cultural in 1984. It was built in the 15th century by converso Juan Sánchez de Bilbao around a previously existing tower house. As of 2022, the building is the seat of the Fundación Vital, a banking foundation part of Kutxabank.

References

External links
 
 

15th-century architecture in Spain
15th-century establishments in Spain
Bien de Interés Cultural landmarks in Álava
Buildings and structures in Vitoria-Gasteiz
Gothic architecture in the Basque Country (autonomous community)
Headquarters in Spain
Houses in Spain